SS Zealandia was the name of the following two steamships:

, an American sail-steamer wrecked off Southport, England in 1917.
, an Australian refrigerated cargo ship sunk by Japanese bombing at Darwin on 19 February 1942.

Spanish–American War auxiliary ships of the United States